Jil Jung Juk is a 2016 Indian Tamil-language neo-Western black comedy film directed by debutant Deeraj Vaidy, who also co-wrote the script with Mohan Ramakrishnan. Siddharth produced the film under Etaki Entertainment banner, and also starred alongside Avinash Raghudevan and Sananth Reddy, playing the titular characters, who were assigned by a dreadful drug lord to transport drugs, and the struggles they faced during their journey, forms the crux of the storyline. The film explores the themes of butterfly effect, post-apocalyptic and futuristic fiction.

Deeraj Vaidy did a pilot film with two of the lead actors during 2014, which impressed Siddharth and asked him to pen down the script, on the lines of a similar theme, where he completed the draft in January 2015. It is touted to be the first Tamil film to be set in a dystopian world, where events were happening in the future and principal shooting for the film was completed within 38 days, where film was shot in Tiruvallur, Chennai and Kanchipuram. The film was officially announced during September 2015, and a four-month long post-production process began during the same month. Vishal Chandrashekhar composed the film's soundtrack and score, while Shreyaas Krishna handled the cinematography and editing done by Kurtz Schneider.

Jil Jung Juk was theatrically released worldwide on 12 February 2016. It generally received mixed-to-positive response, with criticism directed on the slow-paced narration in the second half and the screenplay. However, critics praised its offbeat elements, where the film does not have a typical female lead, and the new concepts used in the film. The performances of the cast and the technical aspects: cinematography, music, film score, editing and use of color palettes in the film was praised by critics. Despite the average performance at the box office, Jil Jung Juk was considered as one of the '25 Greatest Tamil Films of the Decade' by Film Companion.

Plot
In 2020, when there was a huge demand for petrol and money, Deivanayagam, an erstwhile powerful gangster gets a chance to smuggle his cocaine, in order to defeat his nemesis, Rolex Rawther. He hires three guys, Nanjil Sivaji (Jil), Jambulingam (Jung) and Jaguar Jagan (Juk) to safely deliver the cocaine to a Chinese gang in Hyderabad. With the help of a scientist Marundhu, Deiva sells the drug, by coating it in Ambassador car painted pink colour, so that it would not be detected by the police. Along the way, they encounter Narasimhan, who has an almost identical car. Narasimhan eventually befriends the trio and take them into a pub. After a night of drinking, the trio escapes the pub without his knowledge, but only later do they realize that, in a drunken stupor, they have taken Narasimhan's car and not their own. It was revealed that Narasimhan was assigned by Deiva assistant Pai and Marundhu, to steal the car and sell it to another gangster named Attack Albert.

The trio, confused, went to a shooting spot where they see a car, being used in a stunt sequence, left damaged after that shoot. It was later revealed that the car was considered to be that Ambassdor car, which Deiva assigned to deliver. Shocked, and left with dismay, the trio confronts Narasimhan about his plans and takes them with his car. So that they can paint the car in pink, and coat the stuff. But as they do not have cocaine, they decided to approach Attack Albert. Albert kidnaps the trio and eventually manage to escape the location, with the stuff Albert had.

Now, Rawther revealed Deiva's plans, and decided to have a meeting with Deiva. The trio, gets caught by Rawther's men and kept under their custody. During their business dealing, Deiva revealed about the Rolex watch he gave to Rawther was a fake one, which left Rawther deceived. A gang-war took place between Deiva and Rawther's men until Attack Albert arrives and kills the two gangsters, so that he could be a powerful drug lord. He kidnaps, Jil, Jung and Juk to murder them and were taken to a far-away place. They see Juk's father, who was a bus driver, appear in the scene and rescues the trio. Both of them, fought hard with Albert's men. However, Albert arrives with a Gyrojet to kill the men, but it was stopped by a marble and eventually backfired, leading Albert to collapse. Jil, Jung and Juk escape the place and lead a happy life.

Meanwhile the Chinese gang had been waiting for the delivery, since Jil doesn't arrive the dejected Chinese gang cancels the deal midway, and leave empty-handed.

Cast

Production

Development 

Jil Jung Juk marked the debut directorial venture of Deeraj Vaidy. During his career as a software engineer, he chose his interest in filmmaking and had made two short films, before approaching Siddharth in late-2014. He did a pilot film of this film, which impressed Siddharth and asked him to conceptualise the script in order to make it into a feature film format. When he narrated the final draft of this project in January 2015, Siddharth was impressed by the narration and storytelling, which was turned to be "off-beat and conventional" and had an "innovative scope" in the script. Likely, Siddharth had planned to take a break from acting commitments, after his films Kaaviya Thalaivan (2014) and Enakkul Oruvan (2015) underperformed at the box-office despite getting good reviews, had reconsidered his plans to act in the film. Apart from acting, Siddharth agreed to produce the venture under Etaki Entertainment, thus becoming his second film as a producer after Kadhalil Sodhappuvadhu Yeppadi (2012) and his first solo project as a producer.

The title was officially announced in May 2015, which was derived from a dialogue spoken by Vadivelu from Kaadhalan (1994). Deeraj Vaidy co-wrote the script with Mohan Ramakrishnan, his college friend, which is touted to be the first Tamil film set in a dystopian era and being set in a post-apocalyptic world. He said that the film is "an offbeat film which do not require a conventional hero. We needed a space to get creative. My films were zero-budget and I took care of everything. I learnt something new with every film; each one was more progress. I was clear even that someone could find a fault for being technically poor, but that could not be excuse for bad content". The film's technical crew consists of relatively newcomers: except for composer Vishal Chandrashekhar, debutant Shreyaas Krishna handled the cinematography, whilset Kurtz Schneider was the editor.

Casting 
Siddharth starred in the titular character Nanjil Sivaji (Jil). Deeraj chose him as the protagonist in the first place, because he wanted someone who never hesitates to experiment. When he came to Siddharth's house for narrating the story, he saw a CD wall in his room, for which he believed that Siddharth was the right person to experiment. As the film is set in a fictional world, Siddharth wore a blue hair in this film, which is considered to be an "unusual and uncommon look". Avinash Raghudevan and Sananth Reddy were cast in other leading roles as Jambulingam (Jung) and Jaguar Jagan (Juk). The former was described as a "scary" and "logical guy" while the latter was seen as a "constant troublemaker in the film". Avinash practised various mannerisms for his role in the film saying "Whenever Jung speaks, his cheek starts twitching. It was interesting to practise this, and I had full freedom on the set to come up with suggestions". Both Avinash and Sananth had appeared in the pilot version of this film that was shot in 2014, with Kanna Ravi played Siddharth's role in that film. Veteran actors Radha Ravi and Nassar appeared in pivotal roles and RJ Balaji also starred in a cameo appearance. The film did not have a female lead opposite the lead actors; the only female actor present in the film was Jasmin Bhasin, who appeared in a short role as actress Sonu Sawant.

Filming 
Filming of Jil Jung Juk began in late May 2015, with portions of the film being shot in Tiruvallur, Chennai and Kanchipuram. The interior shoots were held in specially designed sets in Chennai, as per Deeraj's insistence to be shot in sets, and Siddharth (also a producer) supported Dheeraj's decision to be shot in sets. Eventually, the team used dummy clapboards while shooting the portions of the film. The shooting of the film silently progressed during May and June, and the team had managed to complete the entire film within 38 days.

Post-Production 
The film's post-production progressed within September 2015, and the team first revealed the film to the media officially on 9 September. As the film required a lot of work on visual effects, the post-production work went progressed nearly four months. Siddharth being a producer, agreed to offer huge costs on post-production so that they can come up with the manageable output, since the film is huge in the aspects of technology, gloss and style. The film's sound mixing done by Vishnu Govind and Sree Sankar, with Suren G. handled re-recording works for the film, while Suresh Ravi worked on digital intermediate and color grading. Work on the project has been delayed eventually due to the South Indian floods, and eventually the team worked day-and-night, so that they can complete the post-production within the end of the year. The film's first look was released by director Karthik Subbaraj in late October 2015.

Themes 
Jil Jung Juk is the first film to be set in a dystopian era, a concept which is first-of-a-kind in Tamil cinema. Being set in a futuristic world, the film explores the three dimensions of physics — mass, time and length — as human characters, describing Jil, Jung and Juk. This concept was evolved during Dheeraj's conversation with his collegemate Mohan Ramakrishnan, during their final years of graduation. Vishal Menon of Film Companion wrote about how the director uses several references for a black comedy film, which had been inspired from the works of Guy Ritchie and Wes Anderson, probably on the subject of a dark comedy. Eventually, the references of a futuristic western action film was noted by several critics and the use of colour in the themes of the films had been referenced to some of Guy Ritchie's works. As per the narrative, the pink color was eventually used in many important sequences.

The film also explored the concept of butterfly effect (an idea about how a small incident causes larger effects), where in a scene that Jil (Siddharth) had this idea referring to a song "Oh Butterfly" from Meera (1992). However, there was a scene which had a flap of a butterfly's wing sets off a series of events, and some sequences referred this concept. The film's only female cast member, Jasmin Bhasin, played the role of Sonu Sawant, a Mumbai-based actress who offered a role in a Tamil film, despite being not familiar in Tamil. This eventually takes a dig at the stereotypical portrayal of women in Tamil cinema, where directors include North Indian actresses in Tamil films as heroines, eventually wanted the female lead to be fair and dumb (loosu ponnu). The film also had a connection with Karakattakkaran (1989). In a scene where Sananth reveals the backstory of his father, a former bus driver, who joined Deiva's gang, and had stole a pink-colour 1960 Chevrolet Impala belonging to 'Rolex' Rawther, along with the cash, and a heroine whom Rawther kidnapped. Siddharth, mockingly asked that his father had kept Soppanasundari, the previous owner of that car, according to Karakattakkaran plot.

Music

Vishal Chandrashekhar composed the soundtrack for Jil Jung Juk, which had five songs written by Vivek, Deeraj Vaidy and Siddharth. The initial script of the film had no songs, and Dheeraj approached Vishal only for composing the background score; a promotional song was eventually made, but in the process, Vishal had recorded five tracks for the album. The soundtrack featured vocals by Anirudh Ravichander, Santhosh Narayanan, Sean Roldan, Anthony Daasan, Andrea Jeremiah, Kavita Thomas. Siddharth and Radha Ravi, who were a part of the film's cast, had recorded two tracks respectively. On 10 November 2015, coinciding with Diwali, the music video of the promotional track "Shoot the Kuruvi" was launched by actor Salman Khan through YouTube. The rest of the songs and the full album released by prominent celebrities on the same day.

A critic from Behindwoods praised the composer for delivering all the songs in a quirky and unconventional western genre; he called the album as "truly international" and rated 3.25 out of five. Writing for BollywoodLife.com, H Shivakumar called the liberal mixture of EDM, jazz, contemporary R&B, rock, dubstep and Western folk as "fantastic" but criticised the lyrical similarities in the songs; he gave verdict saying "the album is quirky and catchy and does not deviate from the film's theme" with a rating of three-and-a-half out of five. Vipin Nair of Music Aloud said the soundtrack is "wacky, but highly imaginative and engaging", assigned a score of 8.5 (out of 10) while Karthik Srinivasan of Milliblog stated the soundtrack as "impressive".

Marketing and release 
Jil Jung Juk was first revealed to the public by launching the first look and teaser in November 2015. Following the wide response for the teaser, in mid-November 2015, Siddharth announced that the film will have a theatrical release worldwide on 25 December 2015, coinciding with Christmas. However, following the 2015 South Indian floods that occurred during early-December, Siddharth announced that the theatrical release of the film will be postponed to 2016, as he and his team had to work on relief measures for the people who were affected by the flood. The trailer of the film was released by S. S. Rajamouli, on the eve of Pongal (14 January 2016), further adding that the film will be released worldwide on 12 February 2016, which also coincided with the eve of Valentine's Day.

To make the promotional activities more unique, the cast of Jil Jung Juk — Siddharth, Sananth and Avinash appeared in a special video made by the YouTube channel Put Chutney, released before the film's release. The video titled 10 Elements of a Commercial Film, which sarcastically mocks at the current trend in the Tamil commercial films had the cast making a parody of themselves and their film. The video garnered attention from film buffs and had garnered more than a million views on YouTube. A Coimbatore-based start-up company named Creative Monkey Games & Technologies, had designed an android game based on the film, that had released before the film's release date (11 February 2016) and was downloaded by 8,000 users within 5 days of the launch. Deeraj Vaidy planned to launch the director's cut version of this film through YouTube on 1 April 2020. However, the video was taken down due to copyright violation.

Reception
Jil Jung Juk opened to mixed-to-positive reviews from critics, while praising the offbeat themes, characterisations and technical aspects, but criticised the slow-paced narration. M. Suganth of The Times of India gave three out of five stars and said "To some extent, the director offsets such disappointments by providing us with a steady stream of quirkiness, but the climax, which is over-stretched and cliched, leaves us with a film that we admire but cannot wholeheartedly fall in love with." Sudhir Srinivasan of The Hindu praised the quirky ideas used in the film, but however criticised the team for "encouraging mainstream and discomfiting ideas". He further went on to say "it’s all rather queer, but fails necessarily equate to enjoyability". Malini Mannath of The New Indian Express said "Jil Jung Juk seems more a case where the actors seem to have had more fun enacting their scenes, than what the viewers experience watching them." S. Saraswathi of Rediff.com gave two-and-a-half out of five saying "The film does have its share of laughs, but it lacks the chaos, excitement and crazy fun that would have made the film more enjoyable. The wacky entertainment that was promised in the intriguing trailer is missing. Despite its faults, Jil Jung Juk does make a decent entertainer."

Latha Srinivasan of Daily News and Analysis criticised the script as "it falls short of expectations, particularly in the second half", however praised the major technical aspects and other novel elements featured in the film, calling it as a "must watch for those who would love to attempt for something different in Tamil cinema". Arathi Kannan of Manorama Online rated three out of five stars and said "Jil Jung Juk a dark comedy could only be justified to some extent, for it doesn't employ the noir elements (popularised by Korean and Hollywood masters) like the brilliance of violence, satirical narrative or even a style statement making cast to their fullest standing. Indiaglitz rated the film 3.75 out of five and wrote "It is commendable that Dheeraj has infused elements of humor in every bit of voiceover, comic strip, title card and subtitle and for extracting neat performances from every cast member. The director also sets the right expectation to his audience in the very beginning and hence the question of logic never arises." Behindwoods gave the film 2.75 out of five and said "JJJ is not that usual route you take to attain entertainment. It is quite unpredictable and intimidating, but giving it a chance, it will grow on you for it could become a cult film one fine day and can give you an unsullied experience."

In contrast, Gauthaman Bhaskaran of Hindustan Times gave one-star out of five and said "Siddharth, Avinash Raghudevan and Sananth Reddy produce enough laughs through some great one-liners in the first half of the film; but this becomes a serious flaw post intermission, when Vaidy, who also wrote the script, runs out of ideas and begins to stretch scenes till they appear irritatingly repetitive. And the performances are passe as well, and do not add up either." Anupama Subramanian of Deccan Chronicle gave two out of five stars and said "The major drawback is its ordinary screenplay. What ideas looked great on paper, lose steam in execution and the jokes fall flat many times, especially during the latter half." Sify gave two out of five stars and said "the film is occasionally Jil (Good) mostly Jung (Average) and largely Juk (Worst)" and further added "Just like any other dark comedies in Tamil cinema (most of them are inspired by Guy Ritchie flicks), here too each and every character has got interesting back stories and to be honest, they initially create good impression but over indulgence and repetitive gags spoils the show."

References

External links

2016 films
2010s Tamil-language films
Indian black comedy films
Indian nonlinear narrative films
Dystopian films
Indian post-apocalyptic films
Indian satirical films
2016 black comedy films
Indian Western (genre) comedy films
Films scored by Vishal Chandrasekhar
Films set in 2020
Stoner films
2016 directorial debut films
2016 comedy films